Andreea Ciurusniuc (born 28 May 2000) is a Romanian artistic gymnast who turned senior in 2016.

Competitive history

References 

Romanian female artistic gymnasts
Living people
2000 births
Competitors at the 2019 Summer Universiade
21st-century Romanian women